WDP may refer to:

 Walt Disney Pictures, main film studio from The Walt Disney Studios
 WDP (company), a paintball manufacturer, distributor, and field operator in England 
 William Dudley Pelley, an American writer, occultist, spiritualist and fascist political activist
 Wireless Datagram Protocol, a datagram-oriented element of the Wireless Application Protocol suite
 World Day of Prayer, an international ecumenical Christian laywomen’s initiative